Thomas Webb (1797 - 1822) was an English coin and medal engraver. He is associated with the Royal Birmingham Society of Artists.

Webb worked for the noted metal producer, Sir Edward Thomason (1769-1849).

References

Members and Associates of the Royal Birmingham Society of Artists
1797 births
1822 deaths